In mathematics, two quantities are in the supergolden ratio if the quotient of the larger number divided by the smaller one is equal to 

which is the only real solution to the equation . It can also be represented using the hyperbolic cosine as:

 

The decimal expansion of this number begins 1.465571231876768026656731…, and the ratio is commonly represented by the Greek letter  (psi). Its reciprocal is:

The supergolden ratio is also the fourth smallest Pisot number.

Supergolden sequence

The supergolden sequence, also known as the Narayana's cows sequence, is a sequence where the ratio between consecutive terms approaches the supergolden ratio. The first values are 1, 1, 1, 2, 3, 4, 6, 9, 13, 19, 28, 41, 60, 88, 129, 189, 277, 406, 595… (OEIS:A000930).

Properties

Many of the properties of the supergolden ratio are related to those of the golden ratio φ. For example, the nth item of Narayana's sequence is the number of ways to tile a 1 × n rectangle with 1 × 1 and 1 × 3 tiles, while the nth term of the Fibonacci sequence is the number of ways to tile a 1 × n rectangle with 1 × 1 and 1 × 2 tiles. The supergolden ratio satisfies , while the golden ratio satisfies . In Fibonacci's rabbit problem, each pair breeds each cycle starting after two cycles, while in Narayana's cow problem, each pair breeds each cycle starting after three cycles. There is a supergolden rectangle that has the property that if a square is removed from one side, the remaining rectangle can be divided into two supergolden rectangles of opposite orientations.

Another example is that both the golden ratio and the supergolden ratio are Pisot numbers.
The supergolden ratio's algebraic conjugates are  

Supergolden rectangle

When a square with the same side length as the shorter side of the rectangle is removed from one side of the rectangle, the sides resulting rectangle will be in a  ratio.

See also
 Solutions to equations similar to :
 Golden ratio – the only positive solution to the equation 
 Plastic number – the only real solution to the equation

Notes

References

Golden ratio
History of geometry
Cubic irrational numbers
Mathematical constants